This name uses Portuguese naming customs. the first or maternal family name is Artur and the second or paternal family name is Da Silva.

Augusto António Artur da Silva (born 1956) is a Bissau-Guinean politician who was the Prime Minister of Guinea-Bissau, appointed by President José Mário Vaz January 30, 2018 to April 16, 2018, to succeed Umaro Sissoco Embaló, who had resigned two weeks earlier.

Career
Artur is a member of the ruling PAIGC Party, and served as education minister in the government of Carlos Gomes Júnior, as well as Foreign Minister. The new Prime Minister's first job will be to organise fresh parliamentary elections in the coming months. But because the PAIGC lost its parliamentary majority, President Vaz sought backing from MPs in the second largest party, the Party of Social Renovation, to secure Silva's appointment.

References

1956 births
Living people
Prime Ministers of Guinea-Bissau
African Party for the Independence of Guinea and Cape Verde politicians
Foreign Ministers of Guinea-Bissau
Date of birth missing (living people)